Frederick Robert Trotter (August 20, 1861 – September 4, 1934) was a farmer and political figure in Nova Scotia, Canada. He represented Antigonish County in the Nova Scotia House of Assembly from 1903 to 1919 as a Liberal member.

He was born in Antigonish, Nova Scotia, the son of Robert Trotter, a Scottish immigrant, and Ann Maclennan. He was the grandson of the Reverend Thomas Trotter. He was educated at Saint Francis Xavier College. Trotter served on the town council for Antigonish and was mayor in 1897 and 1898. He was first elected to the provincial assembly in a 1903 by-election held after Angus McGillivray was named to the bench. Trotter died in Antigonish.

References 
 Photograph, Frederick Robert Trotter, Artefacts Canada

1861 births
1934 deaths
Mayors of places in Nova Scotia
Nova Scotia Liberal Party MLAs
People from Antigonish, Nova Scotia